Budget mostly refers to Budget, a financial plan. It may also refer to:

 Budget Rent a Car, the rental car company
 Budget Group of Companies, the car insurance company Budget
 The Budget, an Amish newspaper
 "Budget", a song by Megan Thee Stallion and Latto from the album Traumazine, 2022